Nassar Mahmoud Nassar (born 1 January 1992) is a Lebanese footballer who plays as a right-back for  club Ansar and the Lebanon national team.

Club career 
In summer 2016, Nassar joined Ansar. On 2 February 2019, his contract was renewed for three years. On 6 February, Nassar suffered an ACL injury during a match against Tripoli. He recovered in August.

On 14 August 2021, Ansar renewed his contract for three years.

International career 
Nassar's first international game for Lebanon came as a starter against Equatorial Guinea on 11 October 2016, playing the whole 90 minutes in a 0–0 home draw. In December 2018, Nassar Nassar was called up for the preliminary squad in view of the 2019 AFC Asian Cup. However, he was forced to abandon the group early due to injury.

Personal life 
Nassar's favourite club worldwide is Spanish side Real Madrid, while is favourite club in the Arab world is Jordanian club Al-Wehdat, due to being a fan of Jordanian coach Abdullah Abu Zema.

Career statistics

International

Honours 
Ansar
 Lebanese Premier League: 2020–21
 Lebanese FA Cup: 2016–17, 2020–21; runner-up: 2021–22
 Lebanese Super Cup: 2021; runner-up: 2017
 Lebanese Elite Cup runner-up: 2016, 2022

Individual
 Lebanese Premier League Team of the Season: 2016–17

References

External links

 
 
 
 
 

1992 births
Living people
People from Tyre, Lebanon
Lebanese footballers
Association football fullbacks
Salam Sour SC players
Tadamon Sour SC players
Al Nabi Chit SC players
Al Ansar FC players
Lebanese Premier League players
Lebanon international footballers